Manchester Community Transport was a bus operator in Greater Manchester, based in Oldham.

History
Manchester Community Transport was established as Wythenshawe Mobile in 1980, under the Urban Aid Funding scheme. In 2005 it was rebranded Manchester Community Transport. The company provides community bus services across the Manchester area as well as Transport for Greater Manchester contracted bus services.

On 1 March 2013, Manchester Community Transport acquired Maytree Travel. However, on 4 April 2013, Maytree Travel ceased trading with services suspended.

On 7 April 2013, Manchester Community Transport commenced operating additional services under contract to Transport for Greater Manchester. As at April 2016, it operated services on 38 routes,

In 2018, MCT was acquired by the HCT Group.

MCT ceased operations in April 2020. Many of its services were taken over by Diamond North West, Go North West, First Manchester, Stagecoach Manchester, Go Goodwins, Stotts Tours and Nexus Move

References

External links

Company website

Companies based in Oldham
Former bus operators in Greater Manchester
Transport companies established in 1980
Transport companies disestablished in 2020
1980 establishments in England
2020 disestablishments in England